Vista is an unincorporated community in Otisco Township, Waseca County, Minnesota, United States.

Notes

Unincorporated communities in Waseca County, Minnesota
Unincorporated communities in Minnesota